Germinal de Souza (born 22 May 1906 in Porto, died 3 November 1968 in Lisbon) was a Portuguese anarchist and secretary of the Iberian Anarchist Federation's Peninsular Committee. During the Spanish Civil War he was elected delegate of the 1,500-strong Land and Freedom Column, a column of the Confederal militias, under the responsibility of Federica Montseny and Diego Abad de Santillán.

References 

Spanish Civil War
Portuguese anarchists
People from Porto
1906 births
1968 deaths